The 1968 Arizona State Sun Devils football team was an American football team that represented Arizona State University in the Western Athletic Conference (WAC) during the 1968 NCAA University Division football season. In their 11th season under head coach Frank Kush, the Sun Devils compiled an 8–2 record (5–1 against WAC opponents), finished in a tie for second place in the WAC, and outscored their opponents by a combined total of 414 to 163.

The team's statistical leaders included Joe Spagnola with 917 passing yards, Art Malone with 1,431 rushing yards, and Fair Hooker with 665 receiving yards.

Schedule

References

Arizona State
Arizona State Sun Devils football seasons
Arizona State Sun Devils football